Sa-Hali Secondary School is a public high school in Kamloops, British Columbia, Canada. It is a part of School District 73 Kamloops/Thompson. Sa-Hali serves grades 8-12 and it operates on a two semester system.

Academics
Sa-Hali offers courses in social studies, English and modern languages, mathematics, business, physical education, technology/practical sciences, sciences, fine arts and special education.

Extra-curriculars 
In 2014, the Sa-Hali Junior Achievement team won 1st Place in the first-ever provincial JABC Innovation Jam. The team also won the People's Choice Award for the most "likes" on their YouTube video pitch.

Athletics 
In 2014, the Sa-Hali Sabres' Senior Girls' Volleyball Team won the British Columbia AA High School Girls' Provincial Volleyball Championship.

In 2010, the Sa-Hali Sabres' Boys' Soccer Team won the British Columbia AA High School Boys' Provincial Soccer Championships.

For the 2011-2012 high school athletic year, the Sa-Hali Sabres received the BC School Sports Outstanding School Award.

References

External links 

 Student Statistics 2012/13 - Sa-Hali Secondary

High schools in Kamloops
Educational institutions established in 1997
1997 establishments in British Columbia